Mary Ann Yates (1728–1787) was an English tragic actress. The daughter of William Graham, a ship's steward and his wife, Mary, she married Richard Yates (c. 1706-1796), a well-known comedian of the time.

In 1754, aged 25, she appeared at Drury Lane as Marcia in Samuel Crisp's Virginia. David Garrick played the part of Virginius. Yates was gradually entrusted with all the leading parts and succeeded the then famous actress Mrs Cibber as the leading tragedienne of the English stage. She was in turn succeeded and eclipsed by the famous Sarah Siddons.

There were benefit performances for Yates in 1797 at The Haymarket which included an appearance by Harriett Litchfield.

Selected roles
 Marcia in Virginia by Samuel Crisp (1754)
 Sandane in Agis by John Home (1758)
 Mandane in The Orphan of China by Arthur Murphy (1759)
 Mrs Lovemore in The Way to Keep Him by Arthur Murphy (1760)
 Araminta in The School for Lovers by William Whitehead (1762)
 Mrs Knightly in The Discovery by Frances Sheridan (1763)
 Mandane in Cyrus by John Hoole (1768)
 Ismena in Timanthes John Hoole (1770)
 Clementina in Clementina by Hugh Kelly (1771)
 Duchess in Braganza by Robert Jephson (1775)
 Edwina in The Battle of Hastings by Richard Cumberland (1778)
 Zoraida in Zoraida by William Hodson (1779)

References

External links
Peter Thomson: Mary Ann Yates at the Oxford Dictionary of National Biography. 

English stage actresses
English Shakespearean actresses
18th-century English actresses
1728 births
1787 deaths